This is a list of the most notable films produced in Cinema of Germany in the 1970s.

For an alphabetical list of articles on West German films see :Category:West German films. For East German films made during the decade see List of East German films.

1970

1971

1972

1973

1974

1975

1976

1977

1978

1979

Notes

References

External links
 German film at the Internet Movie Database (maintains separate lists for West Germany and East Germany)

1970s
Films
German films